Lydia Marie Opøien (November 4, 1894 – November 24, 1961) was a Norwegian actress.

Among other venues, Opøien was engaged with the Oslo New Theater, the Norwegian Theater in Oslo, and the Trøndelag Theater. She also worked with the NRK Radio Theater. Alongside her theater career she was also a film actress. Opøien appeared in twelve films between 1933 and 1957, with her screen debut in Jeppe på bjerget.

She was the lawyer Adam Hiorth's second wife.

Filmography
 1933: Jeppe på bjerget as Nille
 1940: Godvakker-Maren as Mrs. Bjørn
 1942: En herre med bart as Rosa Niehlsen
 1942: Trysil-Knut as a servant girl
 1946: Englandsfarere as Johanne Volden
 1951: Kranes konditori as Mrs. Krane
 1951: Storfolk og småfolk as Mari Smehaugen
 1952: Vi vil skilles as Mrs. Dahl
 1953: Selkvinnen as Dorothea, a servant at the Hammershaimb house
 1953: Skøytekongen as Hellemo's wife
 1954: Aldri annet enn bråk as Mrs. Ramberg
 1957: Ni liv as Jordmoren (the midwife)

References

External links
 
 Lydia Opøien at Sceneweb
 Lydia Opøien at NRK
 Lydia Opøien at the Swedish Film Database

1894 births
1961 deaths
Norwegian stage actresses
Norwegian film actresses
20th-century Norwegian actresses
Actors from Trondheim